Melville F. McHaffie Farm, also known as the Schuyler Arnold Seed Farm, is a historic home and farm located in Jefferson Township, Putnam County, Indiana. The farmhouse was built between 1870 and 1872, and is a two-story, five bay by three bay, Italianate style brick dwelling. It has a hipped roof and recess arched entrance. Also on the property is a contributing two-story frame barn with a large round-arched opening.

It was listed on the National Register of Historic Places in 1983.

References

External links

 Farms on the National Register of Historic Places in Indiana
 Italianate architecture in Indiana
 Houses completed in 1872
 Buildings and structures in Putnam County, Indiana
 National Register of Historic Places in Putnam County, Indiana